Aristocracy is a form of government that places strength in the hands of a small, privileged ruling class, the aristocrats.

At the time of the word's origins in ancient Greece, the Greeks conceived it as rule by the best-qualified citizens—and often contrasted it favorably with monarchy, rule by an individual. The term was first used by such ancient Greeks as Aristotle and Plato, who used it to describe a system where only the best of the citizens, chosen through a careful process of selection, would become rulers, and hereditary rule would actually have been forbidden, unless the rulers' children performed best and were better endowed with the attributes that make a person fit to rule compared with every other citizen in the polity. Hereditary rule in this understanding is more related to oligarchy, a corrupted form of aristocracy where there is rule by a few, but not by the best. Plato, Socrates, Aristotle, Xenophon, and the Spartans considered aristocracy (the ideal form of rule by the few) to be inherently better than the ideal form of rule by the many (democracy), but they also considered the corrupted form of aristocracy (oligarchy) to be worse than the corrupted form of democracy (mob rule). This belief was rooted in the assumption that the masses could only produce average policy, while the best of men could produce the best policy, if they were indeed the best of men. Later Polybius in his analysis of the Roman Constitution used the concept of aristocracy to describe his conception of a republic as a mixed form of government, along with democracy and monarchy in their conception from then, as a system of checks and balances, where each element checks the excesses of the other. In practice, aristocracy often leads to hereditary government, after which the hereditary monarch appoints officers as they see fit.

In modern times, aristocracy was usually seen as rule by a privileged group, the aristocratic class, and has since been contrasted with democracy.

Concept 
The concept evolved in ancient Greece in which a council of leading citizens was commonly empowered. That was contrasted with representative democracy in which a council of citizens was appointed as the "senate" of a city state or other political unit. The Greeks did not like the concept of monarchy, and as their democratic system fell, aristocracy was upheld.

In his 1651 book Leviathan, Thomas Hobbes describes an aristocracy as a commonwealth in which the representative of the citizens is an assembly by part only. It is a system in which only a small part of the population represents the government; "certain men distinguished from the rest". Modern depictions of aristocracy tend to regard it not as the ancient Greek concept of rule by the best, but more as an oligarchy or plutocracy—rule by the few or the wealthy.

The concept of aristocracy according to Plato has an ideal state ruled by the philosopher king. Plato describes "philosopher kings" as "those who love the sight of truth" (Republic 475c) and supports the idea with the analogy of a captain and his ship or a doctor and his medicine. According to him, sailing and health are not things that everyone is qualified to practice by nature. A large part of the Republic then addresses how the educational system should be set up to produce philosopher kings.

Differentiation 
In contrast to its original conceptual drawing in classical antiquity, aristocracy has been associated in the modern era with its more general and degenerated form of oligarchy, specifically an aristocracy class based oligarchy, with entitled nobility as in monarchies or aristocratic merchant republics. Its original classical understanding has been taken up by the modern concepts that can be loosely equivalent to meritocracy or technocracy.

History 
Aristocracies dominated political and economic power for most of the medieval and modern periods almost everywhere in Europe, using their wealth and land ownership to form a powerful political force. The English Civil War involved the first sustained organised effort to reduce aristocratic power in Europe. 

In the 18th century, the rising merchant class attempted to use money to buy into the aristocracy, with some success. However, the French Revolution in the 1790s forced many French aristocrats into exile and caused consternation and shock in the aristocratic families of neighbouring countries. After the defeat of Napoleon in 1814, some of the surviving exiles returned, but their position within French society was not recovered.  

Beginning in Britain, industrialization in the 19th century brought urbanization, with wealth increasingly concentrated in the cities, which absorbed political power. However, as late as 1900, aristocrats maintained political dominance in Britain, Germany, Denmark, Sweden, Austria and Russia, but it was an increasingly-precarious dominion. The First World War had the effect of dramatically reducing the power of aristocrats in all major countries. In Russia, aristocrats were imprisoned and murdered by the communists. After 1900, liberal and socialist governments levied heavy taxes on landowners, spelling their loss of economic power.

See also 

 Elitism
 Gentry
 Nobility
 Old money
 Timocracy
 Tyranny

References

Further reading 
 Bengtsson, Erik, et al. "Aristocratic wealth and inequality in a changing society: Sweden, 1750–1900." Scandinavian Journal of History 44.1 (2019): 27–52. Online
 Cannon, John. History, Oxford University Press, 1997, 
 Liu, Jia. "Study on the Decline of the British Aristocracy from the Perspective of Modernization." 2018 4th International Conference on Economics, Management and Humanities Science (2018). Online
 Schutte, Kimberly. Women, Rank, and Marriage in the British Aristocracy, 1485-2000: An Open Elite? (Springer, 2014).
  Wasson,  Ellis. Aristocracy in the Modern World, Palgrave Macmillan, 2006.

External links 
 
 Aristocracy at Encyclopedia Britannica

Ancient Greek government
Oligarchy
Social classes
Social groups